The 2020 Czech Women's Curling Championship was held in Prague from September 24 to 29, 2020.

Four teams took part in the championship. 

The team "Liboc 3" skipped by Anna Kubešková won the championship (Kubešková won her eighth title as player and skip).

The 2020 Czech Men's Curling Championship was held simultaneously with this championship at the same arena.

Teams

Round Robin
Three best teams to playoffs: first team to final "best of 3" series, 2nd and 3rd teams to semifinal.

  Teams to playoffs
 "W" – technical win, "L" – technical loss

Playoffs

Semifinal
September 27, 18:00 UTC+1

Final ("best of 3" series)
Game 1. September 28, 11:00

Game 2. September 28, 18:00

Final standings

References

See also
2020 Czech Men's Curling Championship
2020 Czech Mixed Doubles Curling Championship

2020
Czech Women's Curling Championship
Curling Women's Championship
Czech Women's Curling Championship
Sports competitions in Prague
2020s in Prague
2020 in Czech women's sport
2020 in women's curling